This is a comprehensive list of songs recorded by English indie pop band Bastille. Since the band formed in 2010, they have released four studio albums, one remix album, four mixtapes and twelve extended plays (EPs).

Songs

Covers

This is a list non-album covers by Bastille.

References

Bastille
Bastille (band) songs